Twodot or Two Dot is a census-designated place (CDP) in west-central Wheatland County, Montana, United States, along the route of U.S. Route 12.

The town derived its name from the cattle brand of George R. Wilson (1830-1907), who donated the land for the town. "Two Dot Wilson" had a cattle brand that was simply two dots, placed side by side on the hip of his cattle. The name stuck and the town's name has become somewhat of a Western legend.

The town was a station stop on the now-abandoned transcontinental main line of the Chicago, Milwaukee, St. Paul and Pacific Railroad ("the Milwaukee Road"), and was the site of one of the substations of the railroad's electrification project. Two Dot was founded in 1900 as a station on the Montana Railroad, local predecessor to the Milwaukee Road.

For much of the town's history, two variant spellings of the town's name were in use: "Two Dot," and "Twodot". The name of the town's post office was officially changed from Twodot to Two Dot in 1999. However, when the community was listed as a census-designated place prior to the 2020 census, the U.S. Census Bureau used the name "Twodot".

Twodot is know for having the best cowboys in the state.  Legend says John Wayne rode to twodot on a train then learned how to ride horseback and cowboy.

Demographics

Education
It is zoned to Harlowton Public Schools.

Popular culture
In 1983 Hank Williams Jr. immortalized Two Dot in his Strong Stuff album with the song "Twodot, Montana".

See also

 List of census-designated places in Montana

References

External links

Census-designated places in Wheatland County, Montana
Census-designated places in Montana
1900 establishments in Montana
Populated places established in 1900